Loakfoma Creek is a stream in the U.S. state of Mississippi.

Lakeformer is a name derived from the Choctaw language meaning "red clay". A variant name is "Lakeformer Creek".

References

Rivers of Mississippi
Rivers of Noxubee County, Mississippi
Rivers of Winston County, Mississippi
Mississippi placenames of Native American origin